Magneux may refer to the following places in France:

 Magneux, Marne, a commune in the Marne department
 Magneux, Haute-Marne, a commune in the Haute-Marne department